Elisabeth Luard née Longmore is a food writer, artist and broadcaster.  She is Chair Emerita of the Oxford Symposium on Food and Cookery.

She was born in 1942, shortly before her father Richard Longmore was killed in action as wing commander of CXX squadron while engaging U-539. Her mother, Millicent Baron, remarried a diplomat who took her to his postings in Uruguay, Spain and Mexico.  She worked at the satirical magazine Private Eye where she met and married the proprietor, Nicholas Luard, in 1962.  They had four children.

Publications
 European Peasant Cookery (1986)
 The Princess and the Pheasant (1987)
 The Barricaded Larder (1988)
 Family Life (1996)
 My Life as a Wife (2008)
 Still Life (2013)
 The Flavours of Andalucia (2017)
 Squirrel Pie
 Classic French cooking
 European festival food
 Food of Spain and Portugal
 Recipes & Ramblings
 Seasonal European Dishes (1990, 2013)
 A Cooks Year in a Welsh Farmhouse

References

External links
Elisabeth Luard – personal web site

Living people
British food writers
1941 births